Maladie d'amour may refer to:
Maladie d'amour (film), 1987 drama directed by Jacques Deray
"Maladie d'amour" (song), French West Indies folk tune arranged by Henri Salvador
 "La Maladie d'amour" (fr), 1973 song by Michel Sardou
 La Maladie d'amour (fr), 1973 album by Michel Sardou